"The Wilderness Downtown" is an interactive multimedia video coded in HTML5 and was published to show off the capabilities of the then new Google Chrome browser.  Directed by music video director Chris Milk and involving the work of a number of Google employees led by Aaron Koblin as well as digital production company B-Reel, it features the song "We Used to Wait" from the Arcade Fire album The Suburbs. It was one of three Grand Prix winners at the 2011 Cannes advertising awards in the Cyber category.

References

External links
thewildernessdowntown.com - official site and video

Music videos
2011 works